The Fundamental Broadcasting Network (FBN) is a network of Conservative Christian radio stations in the United States, based out of the Grace Baptist Church in Newport, North Carolina.

Programs heard on FBN include Family Altar with Lester Roloff, Scripture Reading with Alexander Scourby, Gospel Hour with Oliver B. Greene, Ranger Bill, along with other Christian programming. Its music is predominantly traditionalist in nature, consisting mostly of hymns and some older Southern gospel, with no contemporary Christian music.

Stations
FBN programming is featured on six full-powered stations and 11 translators, as well as 21 additional affiliated stations and translators, most of which are owned and operated by independent Baptist churches, which carry Fundamental Broadcasting Network's programming either in-part or in-whole. FBN's flagship station is WOTJ 90.7 FM in Newport, North Carolina, which began broadcasting December 12, 1988.

The Fundamental Broadcasting Network formerly operated two 50,000-watt shortwave stations, WTJC, which began broadcasting in 1999, and WBOH, which began broadcasting in 2002. WBOH ceased broadcasting in 2010.

Owned-and-operated stations

Translators

Affiliates

Translators

References

External links
Fundamental Broadcasting Network
Grace Baptist Church

Christian radio stations in the United States
American radio networks
Christian fundamentalism
Radio stations established in 1988
1988 establishments in North Carolina